Chuck Ellis, legally known as Charles Ellis, was born December 15, 1985 in Charlotte, NC by the name Jeremy Eli Nicholas to parents Bill Nicholas and his mother, Gwendolyn. Chuck is an American songwriter, vocalist, and music producer. He was given the name Current when adopted at age 9 by his stepfather and later released an EP and a full length album under the name Jeremy Current. Ellis lives in Los Angeles, CA where he writes and performs. He moved to California to pursue a songwriting agreement with Skrillex in 2014 and now resides in Hollywood.

The first self released EP entitled House on Fire by Jeremy Current was self produced and initially distributed in October 2009. The album was well received and was described as "travers[ing] an entire range of emotions, from homesickness to the double-edged sword of love lost and found. There’s a world-weariness here that’s coupled with a quiet determination to keep pressing on. Musically, there’s beautiful instrumentation at work, with each piece of the puzzle subtly complementing the next. Current’s voice hovers just above it all, somehow urgent, yet assured, all at once."  He recorded his full length album Dark Land of the Sun at Skaggs Place Studios in Hendersonville, TN in January 2011. The album was co-produced by Current and Luke Skaggs. It features performances by Ricky Skaggs, The Whites, and Chad Lawson. Creative Loafing praised Current for his "solid songwriting and lyrical content and the perfect voice for its delivery."

In 2012, Jeremy Current was awarded the Abe Olman Scholarship for excellence in songwriting by the Songwriters Hall of Fame.

Upon moving to LA in March 2014, he began introducing himself as Chuck Ellis and started working with notable artists such as Illangelo, with whom he wrote the song Alone which was released on SoundCloud December 25, 2014 and later reproduced by Tchami for his After Life EP. He also contributed vocals to the highly acclaimed Surf (Donnie Trumpet & The Social Experiment album) which was released in summer 2015.

He applied for a legal name change and the request was granted on October 15, 2015 by the Superior Court of California, County of Los Angeles.

In 2017, Ellis started a musical group called Rulers, featuring production from Pomo, Imad Royal, AObeats, Trooko and others. The debut EP Don't Mind was released in November 2017 on Moving Castle (record label) and was praised for its "sultry lyrics and gorgeous pop vocals."

References

1985 births
Living people
Musicians from Charlotte, North Carolina
American male singer-songwriters
American bandleaders
People from Brooklyn
Singer-songwriters from New York (state)
21st-century American singers
21st-century American male singers
Singer-songwriters from North Carolina